Sheikh Mohammed bin Saud bin Saqr Al Qasimi (February 9, 1987) is the Crown Prince of the Emirate of Ras Al Khaimah in the United Arab Emirates and the former chairman of RAK Ceramics.

Biography 
Born on February 9, 1987, to Sheikh Saud bin Saqr Al Qasimi and mother Hana bint Juma Al Majid, he studied at a British curriculum-based school in Ras Al-Khaimah and graduated from University of California in Los Angeles. He holds a BA in Political Science.

After returning from the United States in 2009, he joined the Ras Al Khaimah Ruler's Court and began helping his father in supervising the workflow in government departments and bodies in Ras Al Khaimah. He played a guiding role in supporting many initiatives aimed at enhancing government performance, competition and transparency. He also supervised the implementation of the Mohammed bin Saud Program for the Rehabilitation of Housing which covered the low-populated villages in the mountainous areas of Ras Al Khaimah and provided easy access to clean water and other important services.

Personal life
Sheikh Mohammed married Sheikha Shaikha bint Butti bin Maktoum Al Maktoum in 2018. Shaikha is a granddaughter of late Sheikh Rashid bin Ahmad Al Mualla, former ruler of Umm Al Quwain and a niece of Sheikha Hind bint Maktoum Al Maktoum, consort of Sheikh Mohammed bin Rashid Al Maktoum, ruler of Dubai. The couple has three children:

Salama bint Mohammed Al Qasimi (born 20 March 2020)
Hassa bint Mohammed Al Qasimi (born 1 December 2021)
Zayed bin Mohammed Al Qasimi (born 22 December 2022)

References 

1987 births
Emirati politicians
University of California, Los Angeles alumni
Living people
Sheikhs of the Emirate of Ras Al Khaimah
House of Al Qasimi
People from the Emirate of Ras Al Khaimah
Crown princes
Sons of monarchs